The surname Alphonse may refer to:

Alexandre Alphonse (born 1982), French-born Guadeloupean footballer
Eloi Maxime Alphonse, Malagasy diplomat and Ambassador of Madagascar to Russia 
Gerard A. Alphonse, electrical engineer, physicist and research scientist
Kódjo Kassé Alphonse (born 1993), Ivorian football player 
Lylah M. Alphonse (born 1972), American journalist
Mickaël Alphonse (born 1989), French footballer 
Nadine Alphonse (born 1983), retired Canadian female volleyball player
S. Peter Alphonse, Indian politician

See also

Alphonse (given name)
Alfonso (disambiguation)